This is a list of current bridges and other crossings of the River Calder.

Crossings

See also
List of crossings of the River Aire

References

Calder
Lists of bridges in the United Kingdom
 
Calder
Lists of buildings and structures in West Yorkshire